Tetrops formosus is a species of beetle in the family Cerambycidae. It was described by Baeckmann in 1903. It is known from Kazakhstan, China, and Kyrgyzstan.

Subspecies
 Tetrops formosus formosus Baeckmann, 1903
 Tetrops formosus songaricus Kostin, 1973
 Tetrops formosus bivittulatus Jankovskij, 1934
 Tetrops formosus strandiellus (Breuning, 1943)

References

Tetropini
Beetles described in 1903